Lincoln Park Historic District may refer to:

 Lincoln Park Historic District (Pomona, California), listed on the National Register of Historic Places (NRHP) in Los Angeles County
 Lincoln Park Historic District (Newark, New Jersey), listed on the NRHP in Essex County
 West Bergen-East Lincoln Park Historic District (Jersey City, New Jersey), listed on the NRHP in Hudson County
 Lincoln Park Historic District (Las Vegas, New Mexico), listed on the NRHP in San Miguel County
 Lincoln Park Historic District (Rocky Mount, North Carolina), listed on the NRHP in Edgecombe County

See also
Lincoln Historic District (disambiguation) (of which there are at least two)